Kezabcheh (also Romanized as Kez̄ābcheh; also known as Gazīcheh, Jalālābād, Kadābcheh, Kaẕẕābcheh, and Keāzā Bcheh) is a village in Aqda Rural District, Aqda District, Ardakan County, Yazd Province, Iran. At the 2006 census, its population was 13, in 8 families.

References 

Populated places in Ardakan County